The 1946 Harvard Crimson football team was an American football team that represented Harvard University in the Ivy League during the 1946 college football season. In its 10th season under head coach Dick Harlow, the team compiled a 7–2 record and outscored their opponents 214 to 65.

Despite the end of World War II and return of its longtime coach from military service in 1945, Harvard continued to designate its football program "informal" that year. The 1946 season thus represented the return of "major" college football to Harvard for the first time since fall 1942.

Harvard played its home games at Harvard Stadium in the Allston neighborhood of Boston, Massachusetts.

Schedule

References

Harvard
Harvard Crimson football seasons
Harvard Crimson football
1940s in Boston